Khuzayma ibn Thabit Dhu al-Shahadatayn al-Ansari (d. July 657) was one of the companions of the Islamic prophet, Muhammad.

Biography

610–632: Muhammad's era
He was an Ansar and one among those on whose authority the Hadith of the pond of Khumm was reported.

632–634: Abu Bakr's era
He was among those who initially refused to give allegiance to Abu Bakr.

644–656: Uthman's era
Uthman ibn Affan told the sahaba to gather the Quran so they can compile it into an official book.  Up to that point, it was memorized by the sahaba and kept together written on various materials. One complete copy was available with Hafsa which was prepared during First Caliph Abu bakar.

In the Itqan, Al-Suyuti discussed the number of witnesses required for writing down a revelation of Muhammad.

656–661: Ali's era
He was a general under Ali's command during the Battle of the Camel (656), riding in the head of 1000 Ansar cavaliers.

He died in the Battle of Siffin (657), fighting on the side of Ali.

See also
Thabit (name)

References

Companions of the Prophet
657 deaths